Nathan Bower (born 8 June 1972) is a former Australian rules footballer who played with Richmond in the Australian Football League (AFL) during the 1990s.

Bower was one of three brothers from Mildura to play for Richmond, with Brendan and Darren Bower the others. He was picked up early in the 1989 VFL draft, for the 15th selection and was used at Richmond as a wingman, half back and tagger.

In 1993 he averaged 14.82 disposals but played just half the season. Only once, in 1995, did Bower play a full year in the seniors and his 20 games included three finals where he put in some decent performances.

Bower joined the Bendigo Diggers in 1999 as captain-coach, after being delisted by Richmond.

References

External links
 
 

1972 births
Richmond Football Club players
Bendigo Football Club players
Australian rules footballers from Victoria (Australia)
Living people